Pitiyage Mervyn Piyadasa Jayatunga (9 March 1940 – 1 November 1993), popularly known as Mervyn Jayathunga, was an actor in Sri Lankan cinema and stage drama. He was a highly versatile actor, who popularized villainous roles. Jayathunga acted in several critically acclaimed films, such as Raktha and Pasamithuro.

Personal life
Jayathunga was born on 9 March 1940 in Moratuwa, Sri Lanka (near Colombo), as the eldest of nine siblings. His father, James Jayathunga, was a furniture maker. His mother was Merlin Florida Fernando. He had four brothers—Sumanadasa, Karunadasa, Jinadasa, Nimaladasa—and four sisters—Malani Chandrawathi, Padma Kusumawathi, Ashoka Induwathi, and Bhadra Kanthi.

He started his education at Sri Chandrasekara Maha Vidyalaya, Horethuduwa. At grade 4, he went to Moratu Maha Vidyalaya, where he started studying drama under the guidance of the school principal. He was also a good athlete and a good sitarist. After finishing school, he got a job at Kotuwa Cargo Corporation. Then he worked as a train driver at the Department of Railways. After some years, he started to work as a cartography designer in Department of Survey. He was trained in cartography in Hyderabad, India. He learned martial arts from karate master D.A. Welgama.

He was married to Nalini Hemalatha. She completed her education from Presbyterian Girls' School, Mount Lavinia. The couple had one daughter, Priyadashani Hemali, and one son, Shammie Prabath.

Jayathunga's grandson, Ryan Jayathunga, is also an actor.

Acting career
Initially, Jayathunga was part of an art circle of government service officers. In 1961, he acted in a minor role for the drama Sumudu Bharya. He then joined with drama maestro Henry Jayasena and played in his stage dramas such as Hunuwataye Kathawa, Diriya Mawa, and Apata Puthe Magak Nathe. Under Jayasena's guidance, he acted as a hunter in the television film Elephant Boy.

Jayathunga, who was in charge of Jayasena's stage design, was allowed to go to East Germany to study stage drama. After returning to Sri Lanka, he acted in Gamanak Saha Minihek, Ekadipathi, Sthree, Ran Salakuna, and Kadadasikoti. He was the third Wedi King of the drama Maname by Ediriweera Sarachchandra.

Filmography
Following his stage drama career, Jayathunga was introduced to the silver screen by Wehalle Piyathilaka. His first film acting role was as a music master in Vismaya by Charles Perera. A turning point in his career was the 1977 film Chandi Putha, which established him as a character artist. In 1992, he starred in 17 films, a record at the time in Sri Lankan cinema. On the day he died, he acted in the English television film Fellow Me.

In total, Jayathunga acted in more than 200 films across many genres. 
 
 No. denotes the Number of Sri Lankan film in the Sri Lankan cinema.

Awards

Presidential Awards

|-
|| 1983 ||| Pasamithuro || Merit award ||

References

External links

Sri Lankan male film actors
Sinhalese male actors
1940 births
1993 deaths